The 30th Annual Australian Recording Industry Association Music Awards (generally known as ARIA Music Awards or simply The ARIAs) are a series of award ceremonies which include the 2016 ARIA Artisan Awards, ARIA Hall of Fame Awards, ARIA Fine Arts Awards and the ARIA Awards. The ceremony took place on 23 November at the Star Event Centre and aired on Network Ten. Flume won the most awards, with eight from eleven nominations.

The broadcast rated 586,000 viewers up from 461,000 in 2015. Crowded House were inducted into the ARIA Hall of Fame.

Performers
Bernard Fanning 
Crowded House 
Flume, Kai and Tove Lo 
Illy and Vera Blue 
Jimmy Barnes and Jessica Mauboy 
John Farnham 
Missy Higgins 
The Veronicas
Troye Sivan
Violent Soho

ARIA Hall of Fame inductee
On 5 September, it was announced that Crowded House were to be inducted into the ARIA Hall of Fame.

Nominees and winners

ARIA Awards
Winners are listed first and highlighted in boldface; other final nominees are listed alphabetically by artists' first name.
{| class=wikitable style="width=150%"
|-
! ! style="background:#ff9; width=;"50%"| Album of the Year
! ! style="background:#ff9; width=;"50%"| Best Group
|-
|
Flume – Skin (Future Classic)
RÜFÜS – Bloom (Sweat It Out/Sony Music)
Sia – This Is Acting (Monkey Puzzle/Inertia)
The Avalanches  – Wildflower (Modular/EMI)
Troye Sivan – Blue Neighbourhood (EMI)
|
Violent Soho – Waco (I OH YOU)
King Gizzard & the Lizard Wizard – Nonagon Infinity (Flightless Records/Remote Control Records)
RÜFÜS – Bloom (Sweat It Out/Sony Music)
The Avalanches – Wildflower (Modular/EMI)
The Veronicas – "In My Blood" (Sony Music)
|-
! ! style="background:#ff9; width=;"50%"| Best Male Artist
! ! style="background:#ff9; width=;"50%"| Best Female Artist
|-
|
Flume – Skin (Future Classic)
Bernard Fanning – Civil Dusk (Dew Process/Universal Music)
Guy Sebastian – "Black & Blue" (Sony Music)
Illy – "Papercuts" (featuring Vera Blue) (Warner Music Australia)
Troye Sivan – Blue Neighbourhood (EMI)
|
Sia – This Is Acting (Monkey Puzzle/Inertia)
Delta Goodrem – Wings of the Wild (Sony Music)
Jessica Mauboy – "This Ain't Love" (Sony Music)
Montaigne – Glorious Heights (Wonderlick Recording Company)
Sarah Blasko – Eternal Return (EMI)
|-
! ! style="background:#ff9; width=;"50%" |Best Adult Alternative Album
! ! style="background:#ff9; width=;"50%"| Best Adult Contemporary Album
|-
|
Sarah Blasko – Eternal Return (EMI)
Jarryd James – Thirty One (Dryden Street Limited/Universal Music)
Matt Corby – Telluric (Mercury Australia/Universal Music)
Peter Garrett – A Version of Now (Sony Music)
The Temper Trap – Thick as Thieves (Liberation Music)
|
Bernard Fanning – Civil Dusk (Dew Process/Universal Music)
Bob Evans – Car Boot Sale (EMI)
Paul Kelly – Seven Sonnets & a Song (Gawd Aggie Recordings/Universal Music)
Robert Forster – Songs to Play (EMI)
Tina Arena – Eleven (EMI)
|-
! ! style="background:#ff9; width=;"50%"| Best Hard Rock/Heavy Metal Album
! ! style="background:#ff9; width=;"50%"| Best Rock Album
|-
|
King Gizzard & the Lizard Wizard – Nonagon Infinity (Flightless Records/Remote Control Records)
Hellions – Opera Oblivia (UNFD)
Parkway Drive – Ire (Resist/Cooking Vinyl Australia)
The Amity Affliction – This Could Be Heartbreak (Roadrunner Records)
Twelve Foot Ninja – Outlier (Volkanik/MGM)
|
Violent Soho – Waco (I OH YOU)
Ball Park Music – Every Night the Same Dream (Stop Start Music)
Boy & Bear – Limit of Love (Boy & Bear/Universal Music)
Gang of Youths – Let Me Be Clear (Mosy Recordings/Sony Music)
The Living End – Shift (Dew Process/Universal Music)
|-
! ! style="background:#ff9; width=;"50%"| Best Blues & Roots Album
! ! style="background:#ff9; width=;"50%"| Best Country Album
|-
|
'Russell Morris – [[Red Dirt - Red Heart|Red Dirt Red Heart]] (Chugg Music/MGM)Jimmy Barnes – Soul Searchin' (Liberation Music)
Kev Carmody – Recollections... Reflections... (A Journey) (One Louder Recordings/Universal Music)
The Cat Empire – Rising with the Sun (Two Shoe Records)
The Wilson Pickers – You Can't Catch Fish from a Train (ABC Music/UMA)
|Sara Storer – Silos (ABC Music/Universal Music)Adam Brand and the Outlaws – Adam Brand and the Outlaws (ABC Music/Universal Music)
Bill Chambers – Cold Trail (Checked Label Services)
Fanny Lumsden – Small Town Big Shot (Social Family Records/Universal Music)
The Wolfe Brothers – This Crazy Life (ABC Music/Universal Music)
|-
! ! style="background:#ff9; width=;"50%"| Best Pop Release
! ! style="background:#ff9; width=;"50%"| Best Dance Release
|-
|Flume – "Never Be like You" (featuring Kai) (Future Classic)Illy – "Papercuts" (featuring Vera Blue) (Warner Music Australia)
Sia – This Is Acting (Monkey Puzzle/Inertia)
The Veronicas – "In My Blood" (Sony Music)
Troye Sivan – Blue Neighbourhood (EMI)
|Flume – Skin (Future Classic)Hayden James – "Just a Lover" (Future Classic)
L D R U – "Keeping Score" (featuring Paige IV) (Audio Paxx Agency/Sony Music)
RÜFÜS – Bloom (Sweat It Out/Sony Music)
The Avalanches – Wildflower (Modular/EMI)
|-
! ! style="background:#ff9; width=;"50%"| Best Urban Album
! ! style="background:#ff9; width=;"50%"| Best Children's Album
|-
|Drapht – Seven Mirrors (The Ayems/Sony Music)Citizen Kay – With the People (ASP/MGM)
Koi Child – Koi Child (Pilerats Records)
L-FRESH the Lion – Become (Elefant Traks/Inertia)
Urthboy – The Past Beats Inside Me Like a Second Heartbeat (Elefant Traks/Inertia)
|The Wiggles – Wiggle Town! (ABC Music/Universal Music)Justine Clarke – Pyjama Jam! (ABC Music/Universal Music)
Pat Davern – Alexander the Elephant in Zanzibar (ABC Music/Universal Music)
Play School – Famous Friends: Celebrating 50 Years of Play School (ABC Music/Universal Music)
Sam Moran – Play Along with Sam: BEST. DAY. EVER! (6 Degrees Records/MGM)
|-
! ! style="background:#ff9; width=;"50%"| Breakthrough Artist
! ! style="background:#ff9; width=;"50%"| Best Independent Release
|-
|Montaigne – Glorious Heights (Wonderlick Recording Company)DMA's – Hills End (I OH YOU)
L D R U – "Keeping Score" (featuring Paige IV) (Audio Paxx Agency/Sony Music)
Olympia – Self Talk (EMI)
Safia – "Make Them Wheels Roll" (Warner Music Australia/Parlophone)
|Flume – Skin (Future Classic)Jarryd James – Thirty One (Dryden Street Limited/Universal Music)
King Gizzard & the Lizard Wizard – Nonagon Infinity (Flightless Records/Remote Control Records)
Sia – This Is Acting (Monkey Puzzle/Inertia)
Violent Soho – Waco (I OH YOU)
|}

Public voted

Fine Arts Awards

Winners are listed first and highlighted in boldface; other final nominees are listed alphabetically by artists' first name.

Artisan Awards
Winners are listed first and highlighted in boldface'''; other final nominees are listed alphabetically by artists' first name.

References

External links

2016 in Australian music
2016 music awards
ARIA Music Awards